The 1920 Southern Branch Cubs football team represented the Southern Branch of the University of California (later known as UCLA) in the 1920 college football season. The program, which was later known as the Bruins, was in its second year of existence. The Cubs were coached by Harry Trotter and finished the season with a 0–5 record with a 103–0 loss to Whittier College.

Schedule

References

Southern Branch
UCLA Bruins football seasons
College football winless seasons
Southern Branch Cubs football